Ushi is a village in the Ashtarak Municipality of the Aragatsotn Province of Armenia. It contains a 10th-century chapel, and approximately 1 km outside the village are the ruins of Saint Sargis Monastery of the 7th to 13th centuries. Under the Chapel of Saint Sargis (the only structure still standing), is the grave and re-interred remains of the aforementioned saint. On top of the hill adjacent to the monastery complex are the collapsed remains of an Iron Age fortress.

Gallery

References 

World Gazetteer: Armenia – World-Gazetteer.com

 

Populated places in Aragatsotn Province